Mohamed Ali Ragoubi (born 18 June 1993) is a Tunisian football midfielder who currently plays for Al-Mina'a which competes in the Iraqi Premier League.

References

1993 births
Living people
Tunisian footballers
JS Kairouan players
CS Sfaxien players
Stade Gabèsien players
US Monastir (football) players
Al-Mina'a SC players
Association football midfielders
Tunisian Ligue Professionnelle 1 players
Expatriate footballers in Iraq